Lakeland Airlines (IATA—YQ) was founded in 1980 in Rice Lake, Wisconsin.  It served at various times 11 cities, with commuter service to Minneapolis (MSP), Superior (SUW), Ashland (ASX), Hayward (HYR), Rice Lake (RIE), Eau Claire (EAU), Madison (MSN), Milwaukee (MKE), Chicago (ORD), Wisconsin Rapids (ISW), and Rhinelander (RHI).

The Fleet consisted of Cessna 402s and de Havilland Canada DHC-6 Twin Otters.  Lakeland ceased service in 1984.

See also 
 List of defunct airlines of the United States

References

Defunct airlines of the United States
Airlines established in 1980
Airlines disestablished in 1984
Barron County, Wisconsin